The Profitable house of I. M. Trofimenko is a mansion built in the beginning of the 20th century in Oktyabrsky district of Rostov-on-Don executed in eclecticism style. It is located at 73 Prosveshcheniya Street. The building is an object of cultural heritage of local value. Originally in the building, the profitable house, then paper-mill with printing house was placed. Nowadays I. M. Trofimenko's house occupies Lyceum № 33 of a name of the Rostov regiment of a national militia.

History 
At the beginning of the 20th century, the two-story household located on Prosveshcheniya Street at that time belonged to retired lieutenant Samuel Kipman, the representative of Georges Blok association. The association was engaged in Rostov-on-Don in the sale of bicycles, knitting and sewing machines, weights, arithmometers, cash registers, caskets, etc. In 1909 because of financial difficulties, the company left the market and the house was taken over by sculptor, artist, and schedule Ivan Mikhaylovich Trofimenko. He was the owner of a printing house established on Dmitriyevskaya Street (nowadays Shaumyana). Having got the new building, Trofimenko moved the printing house to his first floor, and placed a paper mill of the Kolorit association on the second. About 30 people worked at the enterprise.

In March 1913, there was the strong fire in the building. The blaze destroyed the entire second floor and roof. All equipment and material of the paper mill became useless: the press, cars, typographical fonts, printing products, and the inventory burned down. The stone walls resisted. All lost property was insured in the Russia and Salamander insurance companies that allowed Trofimenko to not only quickly anew build the building, but also to build on the third floor. After reconstruction revenues of the house, owner increased from 910 to 2580 rubles a year.

Meanwhile, the quickly developing industry of Rostov-on-Don demanded experts in mathematics, physics, and chemistry. In City Council, the issue of opening of the second school in the city was discussed. In February 1914, Duma members considered petitions of 13 house owners suggesting to place this school in Trofimenko's building. The majority of vowels of a thought preferred the new house of Trofimenko, having agreed to pay from the city budget of 7000 rubles a year for rent. A portion of the deputies criticized the place chosen for an educational institution because of its remoteness from the downtown, its proximity to the gvozdilny plant, and because dropouts and workers lived on the premises.

Kozlov , a member of the town council, noted that the educational commission of municipal duma, having carefully examined the building, found these arguments unconvincing. After hearing objections concerning the suburban position of the building, Kozlov pointed to the abundance of educational institutions on the nearby Sennaya Street, and that a tram passes closeby. A petition signed by more than 50 inhabitants of Skobelevskaya (nowadays Red Army) and a number of the neighboring streets, protested against the statement of Lizhdvoya, stating "that their area is dangerous to the pupils passing here due to attack of hooligans on them; working people are not hooligans, and it is more about any hooligans on Aged and New markets and everywhere. These inhabitants also say that near their area there are no doss houses, and Maximov's plant on Skobelevskaya Street publishes, in any case, less noise than the noise of droshkies, trams, and the squeal of the cars which are continuously rushing on Big Garden and other streets of the center".

References 

Tourist attractions in Rostov-on-Don
Buildings and structures in Rostov-on-Don
Cultural heritage monuments in Rostov-on-Don
Cultural heritage monuments of regional significance in Rostov Oblast